The 1927 West Tennessee State Teachers football team was an American football team that represented West Tennessee State Teachers College (now known as the University of Memphis) as an independent during the 1927 college football season. In their fourth season under head coach Zach Curlin, West Tennessee State Teachers compiled a 5–3–1 record.

Schedule

References

West Tennessee State Teachers
Memphis Tigers football seasons
West Tennessee State Teachers football